Communauté d'agglomération du Val de Fensch is a communauté d'agglomération, an intercommunal structure, in the Moselle department, in the Grand Est region, northeastern France. It covers the industrial area between Metz and Thionville. Its name refers to the river Fensch. Created in 2000, its seat is in Hayange. Its area is 86.2 km2. Its population was 70,772 in 2019.

Composition
The communauté d'agglomération consists of the following 10 communes:

Algrange
Fameck
Florange
Hayange
Knutange
Neufchef
Nilvange
Ranguevaux
Serémange-Erzange
Uckange

References

Val de Fensch
Val de Fensch